Loveth Ngusurun Ayila (born 6 September 1994) is a Nigerian international footballer who plays as a  forward for Rivers Angels of the Nigerian Women's Championship and the Nigeria women's national football team.

Club career
Ayila played for Bobruichanka Bobruisk in the Belarusian Premier League before moving to Rivers Angels of the Nigerian Women's Championship.

International career
Aylia represented Nigeria U17 team in the 2010 FIFA U-17 Women's World Cup and the U20 team in the 2014 FIFA U-20 Women's World Cup. She subsequently won three caps for the full national team, and was called up to play in the 2015 FIFA Women's World Cup, although she did not make an appearance at the tournament.

She was also part of Nigeria's winning squad at the 2010 African Women's Championship.

Honours

International
 Nigeria
 African Women's Championship (1): 2010

References

External links
 
 
 

1994 births
Living people
Rivers Angels F.C. players
2015 FIFA Women's World Cup players
Nigeria women's international footballers
Nigerian women's footballers
Women's association football forwards
Nigerian expatriate women's footballers
Nigerian expatriate sportspeople in Belarus
Expatriate women's footballers in Belarus
Bobruichanka Bobruisk players